Yuvaraja's College, Mysore, is a general degree college (Autonomous) located at Mysore, Karnataka. It was established in the year 1928. It is one of the four constituent colleges of University of Mysore. This college offers different undergraduate and postgraduate courses in science.

History
Yuvaraja's College is one of the four constituent Colleges of the University of Mysore. It was first established as an Intermediate College on 24 June 1928 and in the year 1947–48, after Independence, the college was upgraded to a First Grade College.

In the year 1927, His Highness Sri Krishnaraja Wodeyar generously sanctioned the building for the Intermediate College. The foundation-stone for the structure was laid on 8 August 1927 by the eminent thinker and scholar Rajatantra Pravina Sir Brajendranath Seal, the then Vice-chancellor. The foundation stone was laid in the presence of a distinguished gathering which included amongst others, Sir Mirza Ismail, the then Dewan of Mysore, Pandit Motilal Nehru, father of our distinguished first Prime Minister Pandit Jawaharalal Nehru and Mahamokhopadhyaya Sidhanthi Shivashankara Shastry. After the completion of the construction of the main block in 1928, a two-year Intermediate Course in Arts & Science was introduced on 24 June 1928 and thus the college began its eventful career.

In the year 1954, at the time of the celebration of Silver Jubilee, it was renamed as ‘Yuvaraja's College’ to commemorate the association of His Highness Sri Jayachamaraja Wodeyar with the college.

The college has offered pre-medical courses for a number of years. Prior to the establishment of departments in the Manasagangotri campus some Postgraduate courses were also conducted in the college. In 1970–71, the college concentrated on degree courses and the Pre-university Course was closed down and it became the oldest Constituent Science College offering BSc course in the state. The college has been recognized by UGC under 2(f) and 12(B) of UGC Act and Government of Karnataka. A substantial number of students from the SC-ST and other backward communities are given admission into the college, adhering to the Reservation Policy of the State and Central Governments. There are a major section of students, whose parents cannot provide higher education to their wards due to financial constraints.

The University Grants Commission conferred Autonomous Status to the college in the year 2005 and it was extended up to 2020 in the year 2012. Currently, it offers various academic programmes leading to BSc, BCA, BBA, Integrated MSc, MSc, M.A., M.B.A., and PhD degrees. The institution was conferred the status of college with Potential for Excellence in 2010. It was re-accreditation by NAAC in December 2015 at ‘A’ Grade with an upgraded CGPA of 3.34.

Recently the college has been granted by UGC the status of college with potential for excellence for the second phase from year 2017–2022.

Departments

Science

Biochemistry, Biotechnology, Botany, Management Sciences, Chemistry, Computer Science, Electronics, Environmental Science, Food Science and Nutrition, Geology, Mathematics, Microbiology, Molecular Biology, Physics, Sericulture, Statistics, Zoology.

Languages

Kannada, English, Hindi, Urdu, Sanskrit,
Persian.

Accreditation
The college is recognized by the University Grants Commission (UGC).

References

External links
http://ycm.uni-mysore.ac.in

Educational institutions established in 1928
1928 establishments in India
University of Mysore
Colleges affiliated to University of Mysore
Universities and colleges in Mysore